is a 1958 Japanese drama film directed by Kunio Watanabe.

Plot 

Nichiren, a famous Japanese Buddhist monk who returns from his studies to create a new form of Buddhism in preparation for fighting the Mongol invaders during the 1200s. A Buddhist sect and their government supporters target him and he is persecuted for it. Will Nichiren be able to survive before the Mongols threaten Japanese shores?

Cast 
 Kazuo Hasegawa as Nichiren
 Raizo Ichikawa
 Shintaro Katsu
 Narutoshi Hayashi
 Shoji Umewaka
 Yatarō Kurokawa
 Takashi Shimura

Crew

Special effects 

 Yonesaburo Tsukiji - director

 Tōru Matoba
 Hiroshi Imai
 Yoshiyuki Kuroda - assistant director

See also 
Nichiren, The film was also produced by Masaichi Nagata in 1979.

References

External links 
 

1958 films
Films directed by Kunio Watanabe
Daiei Film films
Nichiren

Daiei Film tokusatsu films
1950s Japanese films